The men's triple jump competition at the 2016 Summer Olympics in Rio de Janeiro, Brazil. The event was held at the Olympic Stadium on 15–16 August. Forty-seven athletes from 35 nations competed. The event was won by Christian Taylor of the United States, the fifth man to successfully defend Olympic gold in the triple jump. It was the United States' eighth victory in the event. Just as in London four years earlier, Will Claye took silver; the two Americans were the 13th and 14th men to win multiple medals in the event. Dong Bin of China earned bronze, the nation's first medal in the men's triple jump.

Background

This was the 28th appearance of the event, which is one of 12 athletics events to have been held at every Summer Olympics. Georgia, Guyana, and Mauritius each made their first appearance in the event. The United States competed for the 27th time, having missed only the boycotted 1980 Games.

The top entrant was Christian Taylor of the United States, who was the defending 2012 Olympic champion and the 2015 World Champion. The second best athlete of all-time, he held the season's top mark at 17.78 m. He had been beaten by Will Claye at the American Olympic Trials, who was second on the world rankings and runner-up at the previous Olympics. Cuban Pedro Pablo Pichardo (the 2015 world silver medallist and fourth best of all-time) entered but had not performed highly that year. The 2016 World Indoor Champion Dong Bin started as the fourth best on the world lists. India's Renjith Maheswary and American Chris Benard filled out the world's top five of 2016. The event had enjoyed a resurgence globally and an unusually large starting field of 48 athletes had made the qualifying grade.

Summary

The qualifying round saw perhaps the most significant non-event as #4 all time Pedro Pablo Pichardo scratched. European champion and world indoor silver medalist Max Heß was also unable to qualify.

The final was barely dramatic. On the third jump of the competition, Dong Bin jumped his personal best of 17.58 m (just 1 cm less than the Asian continental record) to take the lead. Four jumpers later, Christian Taylor jumped  which proved to be the gold medal winning jump. Three jumps after Taylor, Will Claye jumped a personal best 17.76 m to take over silver medal position. The 1 cm improvement moved him into the #23 position of all time. From a medal perspective, the next five rounds were unnecessary, none of the medalists improved and no other athlete seriously challenged their position. Taylor jumped 17.77m two times during those subsequent rounds, either of those jumps would have still edged Claye for the win. Taylor and Claye repeated their medals from 2012.

In the medal ceremony, the medals were presented by Austin Sealy, Barbados, IOC member, and the gifts were presented by Alberto Juantorena, Vice President of the IAAF.

Qualification

A National Olympic Committee (NOC) could enter up to 3 qualified athletes in the men's triple jump event if all athletes meet the entry standard during the qualifying period. (The limit of 3 has been in place since the 1930 Olympic Congress.) The qualifying standard was 16.85 metres. The qualifying period was from 1 May 2015 to 11 July 2016. The qualifying distance standards could be obtained in various meets during the given period that have the approval of the IAAF. Only outdoor meets were accepted. NOCs could also use their universality place—each NOC could enter one male athlete regardless of time if they had no male athletes meeting the entry standard for an athletics event—in the triple jump.

Competition format

The competition consisted of two rounds, qualification and final. In qualification, each athlete jumped three times (stopping early if they made the qualifying distance of 16.95 metres). At least the top twelve athletes moved on to the final; if more than twelve reached the qualifying distance, all who did so advanced. Distances were reset for the final round. Finalists jumped three times, after which the eight best jumped three more times (with the best distance of the six jumps counted).

Records

Prior to the competition, the existing world and Olympic records were as follows.

The following record was established during the competition:

The following national record was established during the competition:

Schedule

All times are Brasilia Time (UTC-3)

Results

Qualifying round

Qualification rule: qualification standard 16.95 m (Q) or at least best 12 qualified (q).

Final

References

Men's triple jump
2016
Men's events at the 2016 Summer Olympics